Aikman is a surname, and may refer to

Alexander Aikman (1755–1838), Scottish printer and newspaper publisher in Jamaica
Charles Morton Aikman FRSE (1861-1902) Scottish agricultural chemist and scientific author
Chris Aikman, Canadian astronomer
 David Aikman, journalist
 George Aikman, Scottish painter and engraver
 Gordon Aikman, British ALS researcher and campaigner
 Granville Pearl Aikman (1858–1923), American judge and suffragist
Laura Aikman (born 1985), an English actress
Louisa Susannah Aikman (1755–1831), Scottish-American Loyalist and author
 Michael Aikman (politician) (1797–1881), political figure from Upper Canada
 Troy Aikman (b. 1966), American football player
 William Aikman (painter) (1682—1731), Scottish portrait-painter
 William Aikman (writer) (1824–1909), American writer and pastor

Aikman is from the Scottish name for "oak (aik) man".  First read in Shakespeare's Macbeth see: http://www.surnamedb.com/surname.aspx?name=Aikman

See also
 Robert Aickman